Restiello is one of 28 parishes (administrative divisions) in the municipality of Grado, within the province and autonomous community of Asturias, in northern Spain. 

The population is 46 (INE 2009).

Villages and hamlets include: Restiello, La Vega and Villahizoy.

References

Parishes in Grado